The 1943 Philippine legislative election was held on September 20, 1943 to elect the 54 of the 108 members of the National Assembly of the Second Philippine Republic.

Electoral system 

The 1943 Constitution provided for a unicameral National Assembly that was to be composed of provincial governors and city mayors as ex officio members and one delegate for every province and city who were to serve for a term of three years.

Members from the provinces were elected by the provincial, municipal and municipal district committees of the KALIBAPI, while members from the cities were elected by the city and city district committees. Candidates were required to be registered with the KALIBAPI provincial and city committees. Only members of the KALIBAPI provincial, municipal, municipal district, city and city districts were allowed to vote.

A simple plurality of the votes is needed for a candidate to be elected, and ties are resolved by drawing lots.

Results

References

See also 

 1943 Philippine presidential election

1943 elections in the Philippines
1943
Home front during World War II
1943
Philippines in World War II